Holger Schön (30 March 1910 – 25 March 1980) was a Swedish ski jumper. He competed in the individual event at the 1932 Winter Olympics.

References

1910 births
1980 deaths
Swedish male ski jumpers
Swedish male Nordic combined skiers
Olympic ski jumpers of Sweden
Olympic Nordic combined skiers of Sweden
Ski jumpers at the 1932 Winter Olympics
Nordic combined skiers at the 1932 Winter Olympics
Sportspeople from Stockholm